John Pruyn Beekman (March 13, 1788 Kinderhook, Columbia County, New York – October 16, 1861 Kinderhook, Columbia Co. NY) was an American physician, farmer, banker and politician from New York.

Life
He was the son of John J. Beekman (1761–1795) and Annetje (Pruyn) Beekman and was the older brother of Thomas Beekman (1790–1870), a member of the United States House of Representatives.

Career
Beekman was a doctor who practiced medicine for about twenty years.  He was also a wealthy landowner, President of the New York State Agricultural Society, and was President of the National Bank of Kinderhook, from its establishment in 1839 until his death in 1861.

He was a member of the New York State Senate (3rd D.) from 1845 to 1847, sitting in the 68th, 69th and 70th New York State Legislatures.

Personal life
On May 19, 1821, he married Eliza Griffith Clark (1792–1875), and they had two daughters:
Catherine Beekman (1822–1890), who died unmarried.
Anna Rosalie Beeman (1824–1908), who died unmarried.

Beekman died on October 16, 1861.

Sources
Notes

Sources
The New York Civil List compiled by Franklin Benjamin Hough (pages 135, 140, 215, 224 and 272; Weed, Parsons and Co., 1858)
Genealogies of New Jersey Families ("Eliza Clark", pg. 158)
The Village of Kinderhook by Capt. Franklin Ellis (1878) transcribed at US Gen Net

1788 births
1861 deaths
People from Kinderhook, New York
Democratic Party New York (state) state senators
19th-century American physicians
American bankers
19th-century American politicians
19th-century American businesspeople
Beekman family
Pruyn family